Shavonda E. Sumter (born January 19, 1974)  is an American Democratic Party politician who has represented the 35th Legislative District in the New Jersey General Assembly since taking office in January 2012.

Personal
Sumter was born in Paterson, New Jersey, the daughter of Charles and Bonnie Williams. She attended public and private schools in Paterson, Prospect Park, and Haledon. She graduated from Kean University in 1996 with a B.A. degree in political science. She earned an M.B.A. degree in health care administration from Fairleigh Dickinson University. Sumter has worked in health services and currently serves as director of behavioral health services at Mountainside Medical Center in Glen Ridge.

Sumter has served on the New Jersey Democratic State Committee since 2008. She was one of the members of the electoral college who cast a ballot for Barack Obama and Joe Biden after the 2008 presidential election. In 2010, Sumter was the campaign manager for Jeffery Jones in his successful campaign for Mayor of Paterson.

As of September 2016, Sumter was considering a run for the Democratic nomination for governor in 2017, and was also considered the leading candidate for selection as the party's candidate for lieutenant governor.  However, the eventual Democratic nominee for governor, Phil Murphy, chose Assemblywoman Sheila Oliver as his running mate.

A resident of Paterson, she is married to Kenneth Sumter and has two children: Tyler (1998) and Kenneth Jr. (2000)

New Jersey General Assembly
In the 2011 legislative elections, there were two open Assembly seats in the 35th District, after Nellie Pou decided to run for the State Senate and Elease Evans retired. Sumter and her running mate, Benjie E. Wimberly, defeated the Republican candidates, William Connolly and Donna Puglisi. She was sworn in on January 10, 2012. She held the leadership positions in the Assembly of Majority Conference Leader from 2015 to 2019 and was Deputy Speaker from 2014 to 2015.

Committees 
Committee assignments for the current session are:
Community Development and Affairs, Chair
Commerce and Economic Development
Labor

District 35 
Each of the 40 districts in the New Jersey Legislature has one representative in the New Jersey Senate and two members in the New Jersey General Assembly. The representatives from the 35th District for the 2022—23 Legislative Session are:
 Senator Nellie Pou  (D)
 Assemblywoman Shavonda E. Sumter  (D)
 Assemblyman Benjie Wimberly  (D)

References

External links
 Assemblywoman Shavonda E. Sumter's legislative web page, New Jersey Legislature
 www.ShavondaSumter.com
 https://twitter.com/aswsumter

1974 births
21st-century American politicians
21st-century American women politicians
African-American state legislators in New Jersey
African-American women in politics
Fairleigh Dickinson University alumni
American hospital administrators
Kean University alumni
Living people
Democratic Party members of the New Jersey General Assembly
Politicians from Paterson, New Jersey
2008 United States presidential electors
Women state legislators in New Jersey
21st-century African-American women
21st-century African-American politicians
20th-century African-American people
20th-century African-American women